This is a list of yearly Pacific Coast Conference football standings.

By year

References

Pac-12 Conference
Standings